The 2017 MercedesCup was a men's tennis tournament played on outdoor grass courts. It was the 40th edition of the Stuttgart Open, and part of the ATP World Tour 250 series of the 2017 ATP World Tour. It was held at the Tennis Club Weissenhof in Stuttgart, Germany, from 12 June until 19 June 2017. Fourth-seeded Lucas Pouille won the singles title.

Singles main draw entrants

Seeds 

 1 Rankings are as of May 29, 2017

Other entrants 
The following players received wildcards into the singles main draw:
  Tommy Haas 
  Maximilian Marterer
  Lucas Pouille

The following players received entry using a protected ranking:
  Jerzy Janowicz

The following players received entry from the qualifying draw:
  Márton Fucsovics
  Peter Gojowczyk
  Yannick Hanfmann  
  Lukas Lacko

Withdrawals
Before the tournament
  Karen Khachanov →replaced by  Jerzy Janowicz
  Jiří Veselý →replaced by  Stéphane Robert

Retirements
  Marcos Baghdatis

Doubles main draw entrants

Seeds 

 Rankings are as of May 29, 2017

Other entrants 
The following pairs received wildcards into the doubles main draw:
  Andre Begemann /  Jan-Lennard Struff
  Tommy Haas /  Florian Mayer

Withdrawals 
Before the tournament
  Treat Huey

During the tournament
  Tommy Haas

Finals

Singles 

  Lucas Pouille defeated  Feliciano López,  4–6, 7–6(7–5), 6–4

Doubles 

  Jamie Murray /  Bruno Soares defeated  Oliver Marach /  Mate Pavić, 6–7(4–7), 7–5, [10–5]

References

External links 
 
 ATP tournament profile

Stuttgart Open
Stuttgart Open
2017 in German tennis